Armando Valente (January 12, 1903 in Sampierdarena – December 8, 1997 in Genoa) was an Italian track and field athlete.

Biography
He competed in racewalking in the 1924 Summer Olympics. In 1924 he finished seventh in the 10 km competition at the Paris Games.

Achievements

National championships
He has won 5 times the individual national championship.
5 wins in the 10000 m walk (1922, 1926, 1927, 1928, 1929)

See also
 Italy at the 1924 Summer Olympics

References

External links
 

1903 births
1997 deaths
Italian male racewalkers
Olympic athletes of Italy
Athletes (track and field) at the 1924 Summer Olympics
Sportspeople from Genoa
People from Sampierdarena
20th-century Italian people